Culture Industry Reconsidered, was written in 1963 by Theodor W. Adorno, a German philosopher who belonged to the Frankfurt School of social theory. The term "cultural industry" first appeared in Dialectic of Enlightenment (1947), written by Adorno and Max Horkheimer.

Content 
In the essay Cultural Industry Reconsidered, Adorno replaces the expression "mass culture" with "culture industry". This is to avoid the popular understanding of mass culture as the culture that arises from the masses. He prefers the term "culture industry" because of the commodification of the culture forms or artistic objects. He believes that cultural forms create a means of income for their creators, so profit has become more important than the artistic expression. Hence, culture has turned into an industry and the cultural objects are looked at as products. One of the characteristics of cultural industry is that it intentionally integrates both the high and low art. 

By referring to the term "industry", Adorno does not point to the production process. Instead he is looking at the "standardization of the thing itself" and to the rationalization of distribution techniques, and not strictly to the production process. It is industrial more in a sociological sense, in terms of incorporation of the industrial forms of organization, even though nothing is manufactured. 

He also makes clear the difference between the technique used in cultural industry and the technique used in works of art. In the works of art the technique refers to the formal organization of the object, with its inner logic, whereas in cultural industry it refers to the distribution and the mechanical production. Thus technique in cultural industry is external to the object, whereas in the works of art it is internal. 

Adorno says that the masses are secondary and are "an appendage of the machinery" in the cultural industry. He argues that the culture industry claims to bring order in the chaotic world. It provides human beings with something like a standard and an orientation, yet the thing that it is claiming to preserve is actually being destroyed. The essay also makes a reference to Walter Benjamin’s theory of the "aura". It says that the culture industry doesn’t have an alternative to the aura. Hence, it is going against its own ideologies. Adorno's concept of culture industry indicates the necessity for rethinking his theory of mass culture.

Further reading
Dialectic of Enlightenment, Stanford University Press (2007)

External links 
Stanford Encyclopedia of Philosophy: Theodor Adorno
JumpCut: Adorno on film and mass culture: The culture industry reconsidered by Thomas Andrae
Soundscapes: Culture Industry Reconsidered by Adorno. From: New German Critique, 6, Fall 1975, 12-19 (translated by Anson G. Rabinbach)

Works about avant-garde and experimental art